The 1990 Prague municipal election was held as part of 1990 Czech municipal elections. It was the first election since Velvet Revolution. Civic Forum led by Jaroslav Kořán won the election.

Results

References

1990
Prague municipal election, 1990
Municipal election, 1990